ALDE or Alliance of Liberals and Democrats may refer to:

 Alliance of Liberals and Democrats for Europe (disambiguation)
 Alliance of Liberals and Democrats (Romania), a Romanian political party founded in 2015 and dissolved in 2022

See also 
 Alde (disambiguation)
 Liberal Alliance (disambiguation)
 Democratic Alliance (disambiguation)
 Alliance of Democrats
 Liberal Democratic Party (disambiguation)